Campanula collina, common name blue dwarf bellflower, is a species of flowering plant in the bellflower family Campanulaceae, native to the Caucasus and north-eastern Turkey.

References

External links

collina
Alpine flora